Whitewater Creek is a stream in Mesa County, Colorado.  The stream goes from Land's End to Whitewater, Colorado.

See also
List of rivers of Colorado

References

Rivers of Colorado
Tributaries of the Colorado River in Colorado
Rivers of Mesa County, Colorado